Petrovce is a village and municipality in the Sobrance District in the Košice Region of east Slovakia.

History
In historical records the village was first mentioned in 1571.

Geography
The village lies at an altitude of 290 metres and covers an area of 16.479 km².
It has a population of about 230 people.

Culture
The village has a public library.

External links
 
http://www.statistics.sk/mosmis/eng/run.html
http://en.e-obce.sk/obec/petrovce-kosice/petrovce.html

Villages and municipalities in Sobrance District